Cytidine triphosphate (CTP) is a pyrimidine nucleoside triphosphate. CTP, much like ATP, consists of a ribose sugar, and three phosphate groups. The major difference between the two molecules is the base used, which in CTP is cytosine.

CTP is a substrate in the synthesis of RNA. 

CTP is a high-energy molecule similar to ATP, but its role as an energy coupler is limited to a much smaller subset of metabolic reactions.

CTP is a coenzyme in metabolic reactions like the synthesis of glycerophospholipids, where it is used for activation and transfer of diacylglycerol and lipid head groups, and glycosylation of proteins.

CTP acts as an inhibitor of the enzyme aspartate carbamoyltransferase, which is used in pyrimidine biosynthesis.

See also
 CTP synthase
 Cytidine
 Cytosine
 Pyrimidine biosynthesis

References

Nucleotides
Phosphate esters
Pyrimidones